Aldhal is a village in Raichur district in the southern state of Karnataka, India. Administratively, it is part of the Janekal gram panchayat in Manvi Taluka.

References

Villages in Raichur district